Edward Openshaw Phillips (November 26, 1931 – May 30, 2020) was a Canadian novelist, who has written both mystery novels and mainstream literary fiction. He was best known for his mystery novel series featuring gay detective Geoffrey Chadwick.

Biography
Phillips lived most of his life in Westmount, Quebec. He graduated from Bishop's College School and earned a law degree from the Université de Montréal in 1956, but decided against legal practice. He subsequently graduated from Harvard University with a master's degree in teaching, and later earned a second master's degree in English literature from Boston University. After teaching school for seven years, first in the public English school system and then at Selwyn House School, he pursued a long-time interest in painting. His work was exhibited in five one-man and numerous group shows.

His first novel, Sunday's Child, was published in 1981, and was shortlisted for the Books in Canada First Novel Award. Phillips won the Arthur Ellis Award for Best Novel in 1987 for his novel Buried on Sunday, and was shortlisted for the Stephen Leacock Memorial Medal for Humour in 1989 for his novel Hope Springs Eternal. His short story "Matthew and Chauncy" was adapted by Anne Claire Poirier into the 1989 film Salut Victor.

He was out as gay. His partner, Kenneth Woodman, predeceased him in 2018.

Works
Sunday's Child
Where There's a Will
A Voyage on Sunday
No Early Birds
The Mice Will Play
Buried on Sunday
Sunday Best
Working on Sunday
Hope Springs Eternal
The Landlady's Niece
A Month of Sundays
The Queen's Court

References

1931 births
2020 deaths
Canadian male novelists
People from Westmount, Quebec
Université de Montréal alumni
Harvard Graduate School of Education alumni
Boston University College of Arts and Sciences alumni
Anglophone Quebec people
Canadian mystery writers
20th-century Canadian novelists
21st-century Canadian novelists
Canadian gay writers
Canadian LGBT novelists
20th-century Canadian male writers
21st-century Canadian male writers
Gay novelists
20th-century Canadian LGBT people
21st-century Canadian LGBT people